Stian Hole (born 20 March 1969, in Tønsberg, Norway) is a Norwegian graphic designer, illustrator and writer of children's books.

Biography
He has made numerous book covers and four picture books which have gained national and international recognition. His book Garmann's Summer earned him an Ezra Jack Keats New Writer Award in 2009. In 2009, he won the Nordic Children's Book Prize.

References

External links
 A Conversation with Norwegian Author-Illustrator, Stian Hole (2014)
 

Norwegian illustrators
Norwegian children's book illustrators
Norwegian children's writers
Living people
1969 births
Writers from Tønsberg